Kelley Hyndman (born September 22, 1985) is an American former professional tennis player.

Hyndman was born in Massachusetts and is the daughter of Canadian Mike Hyndman, who played professional ice hockey in the World Hockey Association. Her younger sister Yvette was also a world ranked tennis player.

In 1999 at the age of 14, Hydnman was a singles finalist at the Eddie Herr International Championships for the 16s age group, while securing titles in both the girls' doubles and mixed doubles events.

Hyndman competed in collegiate tennis for the University of Georgia, alongside her sister Yvette. She was named the team's MVP when they captured the SEC championship title in 2008, winning all of her matches.

As a professional player she had a best singles world rankings of 570. She made a WTA Tour main draw appearance in doubles at the 2002 Challenge Bell and won a $25,000 ITF doubles title in Hammond, Louisiana in 2005.

ITF Circuit finals

Doubles: 1 (1–0)

References

External links
 
 

1985 births
Living people
American female tennis players
Georgia Lady Bulldogs tennis players
Tennis people from Massachusetts
American sportspeople of Canadian descent
Sportspeople from Plymouth County, Massachusetts